Staroye Azmeyevo (İśke Äzmey) is a rural locality (a selo) in Diyashevsky Selsoviet, Bakalinsky District, Bashkortostan, Russia. The population was 343 as of 2010. There are 3 streets.

Geography 
Staroye Azmeyevo is located 26 km west of Bakaly (the district's administrative centre) by road. Novoye Azmeyevo is the nearest rural locality.

References 

Rural localities in Bakalinsky District